The Changing of the Guard is the twelfth album by indie rock band Starflyer 59. It was released on August 10, 2010. The album was produced by Jason Martin and mixed by JR McNeely.

Test vinyl pressings of the album, limited to 25 copies, went on sale on June 16 and were mailed on July 17, 2010, in white vinyl. All pressings of the album came in a deluxe gatefold LP format, accompanied by a 7-inch record with two bonus tracks. The final copies of the official pressing was released on coloured vinyl, as opposed to the plain-coloured copies of the main production run.

Track listing
 "Fun is Fun"
 "Shane"
 "Time Machine"
 "Trucker's Son"
 "The Morning Rise / Frightening Eyes"
 "I Had a Song for the Ages"
 "Coconut Trees"
 "Cry Me a River"
 "Kick the Can"
 "Lose My Mind"

References

Starflyer 59 albums
2010 albums
Tooth & Nail Records albums